Alejandro Urdapilleta (10 March 1954 – 1 December 2013) was an Uruguayan actor. He appeared in more than twenty films from 1989 to 2013.

Selected filmography

References

External links 

1954 births
2013 deaths
Uruguayan LGBT actors
Uruguayan male film actors
21st-century Uruguayan LGBT people